Swapnil Patil (born 15 April 1985) is an Indian-born cricketer who played for the United Arab Emirates national cricket team. Patil is a right-handed wicket-keeper batsman.

Career
He played for the United Arab Emirates in the 2014 Cricket World Cup Qualifier tournament where he made ODI debut in final in New Zealand against Scotland at Bert Sutcliffe Oval in Lincoln.
 
Patil was among six players making their One Day International (ODI) debuts and he impressed with a run-a-ball 99. He was dropped off the penultimate ball and needed two off the final delivery of the chase to reach a memorable century but could only edge to midwicket for a single. Patil became the second player to score 99 on ODI debut after Eoin Morgan. Patil also set the record for becoming the first cricketer to be unbeaten on 99 on ODI debut.

In March 2014, he made his T20I debut against Netherlands in Sylhet Stadium in ICC World Twenty20 in Bangladesh. He scored 23 runs off 28 balls before being dismissed by Tom Cooper.

References

External links

1985 births
Living people
Emirati cricketers
United Arab Emirates One Day International cricketers
United Arab Emirates Twenty20 International cricketers
People from Thane
Indian cricketers
Cricketers from Maharashtra
Indian emigrants to the United Arab Emirates
Indian expatriate sportspeople in the United Arab Emirates
Cricketers at the 2015 Cricket World Cup
Wicket-keepers